was an  destroyer of the Imperial Japanese Navy. Her name means "New Moon (in Autumn)" or "(another name of) August".

Design and description
The Akizuki-class ships were originally designed as anti-aircraft escorts for carrier battle groups, but were modified with torpedo tubes and depth charges to meet the need for more general-purpose destroyer. Her crew numbered 300 officers and enlisted men.

The ship had two Kampon geared steam turbines, each driving one propeller shaft, using steam provided by three Kampon water-tube boilers.

The main armament of the Akizuki class consisted of eight Type 98  dual purpose guns in four twin-gun turrets, two superfiring pairs fore and aft of the superstructure. They carried four Type 96  anti-aircraft guns in two twin-gun mounts. The ships were also armed with four  torpedo tubes in a single quadruple traversing mount; one reload was carried for each tube. Their anti-submarine weapons consisted of six depth charge throwers for which 72 depth charges were carried.

Career and fate
In October 1944 Hatsuzuki was part of the Northern Force commanded by Admiral Jisaburo Ozawa, in the Japanese attack on the Allied forces supporting the invasion of Leyte. 

On the 25 October, during the Battle off Cape Engaño, Hatsuzuki encountered a detachment of Halsey's Task Force 34 (TF.34) consisting of the four cruisers USS New Orleans, USS Wichita, USS Santa Fe and USS Mobile and at least 9 destroyers. ENE of Cape Engaño.

The only survivors of her crew were 8 men in a lifeboat with 17 Zuikaku crewmen who made their way to Luzon by the 14th November, having been providentially cast off when Hatsuzuki got underway to engage the enemy.

Notes

References

External links
 CombinedFleet.com: Akizuki-class destroyers
 CombinedFleet.com: Hatsuzuki history

Akizuki-class destroyers (1942)
World War II destroyers of Japan
World War II shipwrecks in the South China Sea
1942 ships
Maritime incidents in October 1944
Naval magazine explosions